Ivan Đurić (30 October 1947 – 23 November 1997) was a Serbian writer, professor, historian and politician.

Biography
Đurić was born on 30 October 1947 to parents Dušan S. Đurić (1920–1997) and Ivana (née Bogdanović; born 1925). Both of them were university professors. His father was nicknamed Zinaja after the footballer and cross-country skier.

Đurić ran for President of Serbia in the 1990 Serbian general election as a joint candidate of the Association for Yugoslav Democratic Initiative and the Union of Reform Forces. He finished in third place (behind Slobodan Milošević and Vuk Drašković) with 277,398 votes.

He moved to Paris, France in November 1991 where he died on 23 November 1997.

Personal life
His paternal great-grandfather is Serbian Orthodox priest  who was one of the founders of the People's Radical Party.

His maternal grandfather is author Milan Bogdanović. Bogdan Bogdanović, an architect and former mayor of Belgrade,was his maternal uncle.

Notable published books
 Ektesis nea, 1974
 Porodica Foka, 1976
 Oxford Dictionary of Byzantium, 1980 (multiple authors)
 Sumrak Vizantije: Vreme Jovana VIII Paleologa 1392-1448, 1984
 Romejski govor i jezik Konstantina VII Porfirogenita, 1986
 Istorija – pribežište ili putokaz, 1990
 Vlast, opozicija, alternativa, 2009 (posthumously)

References

1947 births
1997 deaths
Politicians from Belgrade
Serbian Byzantinists
Serbian emigrants to France
Candidates for President of Serbia
University of Belgrade Faculty of Philosophy alumni
Academic staff of the University of Belgrade
Scholars of Byzantine history
Burials at Belgrade New Cemetery